Buenos Aires Nights (Spanish:Noches de Buenos Aires) is a 1935 Argentine romantic musical film directed and written by Manuel Romero with Luis Bayón Herrera. It is a tango film and was edited by Francisco Múgica

The film's sets were designed by Ricardo J. Conord.

Cast
Fernando Ochóa
Tita Merello
Severo Fernández
Irma Córdoba
Enrique Serrano
Héctor Calcaño
Fernando Campos
Tito Climent
Inés Edmonson
Juan Mangiante
Aída Olivier
Guillermo Pedemonte
Joaquín Petrocino
Alfredo Pozzio
Alberto Soifer

External links

1935 films
1930s Spanish-language films
Argentine black-and-white films
Tango films
Films directed by Manuel Romero
Films shot in Buenos Aires
Films set in Buenos Aires
1930s romantic musical films
Argentine romantic musical films
1930s Argentine films